{{DISPLAYTITLE:C17H16ClN3O}}
The molecular formula C17H16ClN3O (molar mass: 313.78 g/mol, exact mass: 313.0982 u) may refer to:

 Amoxapine
 YM-976

Molecular formulas